Nadège Abomangoli (born 15 September 1975) is a French politician from La France Insoumise. She was elected as the member of parliament for Seine-Saint-Denis's 10th constituency in the 2022 French legislative election.

See also 
 List of deputies of the 16th National Assembly of France

References 

1975 births
Living people
People from Brazzaville
Republic of the Congo expatriates in France
French people of Republic of the Congo descent
21st-century French politicians
21st-century French women politicians
Deputies of the 16th National Assembly of the French Fifth Republic
La France Insoumise politicians
Women members of the National Assembly (France)
Black French politicians
Members of Parliament for Seine-Saint-Denis
Sciences Po alumni